Qeqertarsuaq (meaning "Large Island") is an island in Avannaata municipality, located in the Karrat Fjord in northwestern Greenland. Nearby islands are Illorsuit Island and Upernivik Island.

The island has a settlement called Nuugaatsiaq.

The island has a  mountain called Snehætten (meaning Snow hat in Danish), an Ultra prominent peak.

See also
 List of islands of Greenland
 Qeqertarsuaq

References

Topomapper

Uninhabited islands of Greenland